Isaac Hamilton Rapp, (1854 – March 27, 1933) was an American architect who has been called the "Creator of the Santa Fe style." He was born in Orange, New Jersey.

Rapp learned his trade working for his father, a sometime architect and building contractor in Carbondale, Illinois.  He left in 1887 and by 1889 had moved to Trinidad, Colorado where he joined with C.W. Bulger in establishing the architectural firm of Bulger and Rapp.  The company dissolved after about  five years at which point Rapp's brother William Mason Rapp moved to Trinidad and the firm of Rapp and Rapp was created. (This should not be confused with the architectural firm of Rapp and Rapp, noted for their theatre designs, composed of Isaac Rapp's two youngest brothers, Cornelius and George.)  Eventually a third brother, Charles Rapp moved to Trinidad, but did not join the architectural firm.

The First Christian Church in Trinidad, built in 1922, was one of the later works by Rapp.

Isaac Rapp died in 1933 at his home in Trinidad, Colorado.

Notable commissions

All are in Santa Fe, New Mexico unless otherwise noted:
 Chaves County Courthouse, Roswell, Chaves County, New Mexico, 1911
 La Fonda Hotel, 1921–1922
 Las Animas County Court House, Trinidad, Las Animas County, Colorado, 1912
 New Mexico Building at the Panama–California Exposition, San Diego, California, 1915
 New Mexico Military Institute (multiple buildings), Roswell, beginning 1907
 New Mexico Museum of Art, 1917
 New Mexico State Building, Saint Louis World's Fair, St. Louis, Missouri,  1904
 New Mexico Territorial Capitol, 1903 (no longer extant, though parts of it can still be found inside the Bataan Building)
 New Mexico Territorial Executive Mansion, 1908  (no longer extant)
Gross, Kelly, and Company Warehouse, built in 1913, in the Santa Fe Historic District
First Christian Church of Trinidad, Colorado, 1922
 Fox West Theatre, Trinidad, Las Animas County, Colorado, 1908
 Temple Aaron, Trinidad, Colorado, 1889

References

1854 births
1933 deaths
Architects from Colorado
Architects from New Mexico
Pueblo Revival architecture